William Henry Furber was a Massachusetts politician who served as the second Mayor of Somerville, Massachusetts.

Notes

Mayors of Somerville, Massachusetts
Massachusetts city council members
1912 deaths
Year of birth missing